A list of American films released in 1965.

The Sound of Music won the Academy Award for Best Picture.

A–D

E–I

J–R

S–Z

See also
 1965 in the United States

Notes

References

External links

1965 films at the Internet Movie Database

1965
Films
Lists of 1965 films by country or language